The Landry Award is an honor given annually to the top high school football player in North Texas. The award was established in 2010 and named after legendary former Dallas Cowboys coach Tom Landry. It is awarded by Dallas-Fort Worth CBS affiliate KTVT in conjunction with the Fellowship of Christian Athletes.

Award winners

References
Footnotes

External links
The Landry Award

High school football trophies and awards in the United States
American football in Texas
Awards established in 2010
2010 establishments in Texas